On 24 April 1992, the Peshawar Accord was announced by several but not all Afghan mujahideen parties: Gulbuddin Hekmatyar, leader of Hezb-e Islami, had since March 1992 opposed these attempts at a coalition government.

The accord proclaimed an Afghan interim government called the Islamic State of Afghanistan to start serving on 28 April 1992. Due to rivalling forces contending for total power, that interim government was paralyzed right from the start.

Afghan mujahideen parties discussing in Peshawar, Pakistan had on 26 April 1992 agreed on proclaiming a leadership council assuring residual powers for the party leaders under an interim President Sibghatullah Mojaddedi or Mujaddidi (a religious leader) serving from 28 April to 28 June 1992. Jamiat-e Islami's leader Burhanuddin Rabbani would then succeed him as interim President until 28 October, and also in 1992 a national shura was to ratify a provisional constitution and choose an interim government for eighteen months, followed by elections. In the Peshawar Accord, Ahmad Shah Massoud was appointed as interim minister of defense for the Mujaddidi government.

Historical background 

In April 1992, the Soviet-backed Afghan communist government of Mohammad Najibullah could no longer sustain itself against the Afghan mujahideen. Ahmad Shah Massoud's mujahideen, allied with Sayyid Mansor's Ismailis and former communist general Abdul Rashid Dostum's forces, captured Afghanistan's major air force base Bagram, seventy kilometers north of Kabul. Senior communist generals and officials of the Najibullah administration acted as a transitional authority to transfer power to Ahmad Shah Massoud's alliance. The Kabul interim authority invited Massoud to enter Kabul as the new Head of State, but he held back. Massoud ordered his forces, positioned to the north of Kabul, not to enter the capital until a political solution was in place. He called on the senior party leaders based in exile in Peshawar to work out a political settlement acceptable to all sides and parties.

Meanwhile, other mujahideen factions were starting to advance towards the capital city Kabul from different sides, Gulbuddin Hekmatyar's Hezb-e Islami from the south, Abdul Rasul Sayyaf's Ittehad-e Islami from the west, Abdul Ali Mazari's Hezb-e Wahdat also from the west and the Hezb-e Islami Khalis from the east.

The international community in the form of the United Nations and most Afghan political parties decided to appoint a legitimate national government, to succeed communist rule, through an elite settlement among the different resistance parties.

While the external Afghan party leaders were meeting in Peshawar, the military situation around Kabul involving the internal commanders was tense. While Massoud supported the Peshawar process of establishing a broad coalition government inclusive of all sides, Hekmatyar sought to become the sole ruler of Afghanistan stating, "In our country coalition government is impossible because, this way or another, it is going to be weak and incapable of stabilizing the situation in Afghanistan." Massoud pertained: "All the parties had participated in the war, in jihad in Afghanistan, so they had to have their share in the government, and in the formation of the government. Afghanistan is made up of different nationalities. We were worried about a national conflict between different tribes and different nationalities. In order to give everybody their own rights and also to avoid bloodshed in Kabul, we left the word to the parties so they should decide about the country as a whole. We talked about it for a temporary stage and then after that the ground should be prepared for a general election."

A recorded radio communication between the two leaders showed the divide as Massoud asked Hekmatyar: "The Kabul regime is ready to surrender, so instead of the fighting we should gather. ... The leaders are meeting in Peshawar. ... The troops should not enter Kabul, they should enter later on as part of the government." Hekmatyar's response: "We will march into Kabul with our naked sword. No one can stop us. ... Why should we meet the leaders?" Massoud answered: "It seems to me that you don't want to join the leaders in Peshawar nor stop your threat, and you are planning to enter Kabul ... in that case I must defend the people."

At that point even Osama bin Laden, who had worked extensively with Hekmatyar in Peshawar, urged Hekmatyar to "go back with your brothers" and to accept a compromise with the other resistance parties.  But Hekmatyar refused, confident that he would be able to gain sole power in Afghanistan.

Text of the Peshawar Accord
The text of the Peshawar Accord as provided by the United Nations and the University of Ulster:

See also 

Islamic State of Afghanistan

References

Bibliography

External links
Recorded conversation between Massoud and Hekmatyar, April 1992 (Dari)

Afghanistan conflict (1978–present)
Peshawar